The Coal Belt Conference was an Illinois high school athletic conference in existence from 1946-1956. The conference dissolved when 5 of its 7 members joined the Black Diamond Conference full-time.

Members

See also
Black Diamond Conference

References 

High school sports conferences and leagues in the United States
Illinois high school sports conferences
High school sports in Illinois